The following is a list of Hong Kong women's national rugby union team international matches.

Overall 
Hong Kong's overall international match record against all nations, updated to 21 December 2022, is as follows:

Full internationals

1990s

2000s

2010s 

Hong Kong makes their Rugby World Cup debut in Ireland.

2020s

Other matches

References 

Hong Kong
Rugby union in Hong Kong